Decorin is a protein that in humans is encoded by the DCN gene.

Decorin is a proteoglycan that is on average 90 - 140 kilodaltons (kDa) in molecular weight.  It belongs to the small leucine-rich proteoglycan (SLRP) family and consists of a protein core containing leucine repeats with a glycosaminoglycan (GAG) chain consisting of either chondroitin sulfate (CS) or dermatan sulfate (DS).

Decorin is a small cellular or pericellular matrix proteoglycan and is closely related in structure to biglycan protein. Decorin and biglycan are thought to be the result of a gene duplication. This protein is a component of connective tissue, binds to type I collagen fibrils, and plays a role in matrix assembly.

Naming 

Decorin's name is a derivative of both the fact that it "decorates" collagen type I, and that it interacts with the "d" and "e" bands of fibrils of this collagen.

Function 

Decorin appears to influence fibrillogenesis, and also interacts with fibronectin, thrombospondin, the complement component C1q, epidermal growth factor receptor (EGFR) and transforming growth factor-beta (TGF-beta).

Decorin has been shown to either enhance or inhibit the activity of TGF-beta 1. The primary function of decorin involves regulation during the cell cycle.

It has been involved in the regulation of autophagy, of endothelial cell and inhibits angiogenesis. This process is mediated by a high-affinity interaction with VEGFR2 (vascular endothelial growth factor receptor) which leads to increased levels of tumor suppressor gene called PEG3. Other angiogenic growth factors that decorin inhibits are angiopoietin, hepatocyte growth factor (HGF) and platelet-derived growth factor (PDGF).

Decorin has recently been established as a myokine. In this role, it promotes muscle hypertrophy by binding with myostatin.

Clinical significance 

Keloid scars have decreased decorin expression compared to healthy skin. Development of congenital stromal corneal dystrophy is dependent on export and extracellular deposition of truncated decorin.

Animal studies 

Infusion of decorin into experimental rodent spinal cord injuries has been shown to suppress scar formation and promote axon growth.

Decorin has been shown to have anti-tumorigenic properties in an experimental murine tumor model and is capable of suppressing the growth of various tumor cell lines.  The decorin-deficient knockout mouse shows reduced inflammatory reactions during contact dermatitis due to a defect in leukocyte recruitment and altered interferon gamma function.

Interactions 

Decorin has been shown to interact with:
 Collagen type I
 Epidermal growth factor receptor  and
 TGF beta 1,
 TLR2, and 
 TLR4.

References

Further reading

External links 
 GeneReviews/NCBI/NIH/UW entry on Congenital Stromal Corneal Dystrophy

Extracellular matrix proteins
LRR domain
Proteoglycans
LRR proteins